The Battle of Cotyaeum (modern Kütahya) of 492 CE was a major engagement is the Isaurian War fought in Phrygia Epictetus. The future Byzantine emperor Justin I was present at the battle as a subordinate commander.

In 2015 a mass grave containing around sixty skeletons was found in Kütahya, believed to be of Roman date. Investigations are ongoing as to whether these skeletons are victims of the Isaurian War or the Battle of Cotyaeum.

References

Cotyaeum
490s in the Byzantine Empire
5th century in the Byzantine Empire
Cotyaeum
Isaurians